Kirs may refer to:

People
Eduard Kirs (1887–1963), Estonian music teacher, trade unionist and politician
Friido Kirs (1889–1948), Estonian schoolteacher and politician
Rudolf Kirs (1915–1963), Czech cellist
Urmas Kirs (b. 1966), Estonian footballer and manager
Vallo Kirs (b. 1987), Estonian actor

Places
Kirs, former name of Kitsk, a village in Armenia
Kirs, Russia, a town in Kirov Oblast, Russia

Other
Kirs, inwardly-rectifying potassium channels
KIRS (FM), a radio station (107.7 FM) licensed to serve Stockton, Missouri, United States

See also
KIR (disambiguation)

Estonian-language surnames